Luster is a surname. Notable people with the surname include:

 Ahrue Luster, guitarist, also played the piano
 Andrew Luster (born 1963), heir to the Max Factor cosmetics fortune and convicted multiple rapist
 Betty Luster (1922–2011), American television actress, singer, and dancer
 Dewey Luster (1899–1980), head coach of the Oklahoma Sooners college football team
 Leo Luster (1927–2017), Austrian Holocaust survivor
 Leo Luster, alter ego of a character in the television series Donkey Kong Country
 Marv Luster (born 1937), Canadian Football League player
 Scott Luster, women's volleyball coach
 June Christy (1925–1990), American jazz singer born Shirley Luster
 Heather Luster (1981- ), self-proclaimed comedian born James Luster